The  SMKbox riboswitch (also known as SAM-III) is an RNA element that regulates gene expression in bacteria.  The SMK box riboswitch is found in the 5' UTR of the MetK gene in lactic acid bacteria. The structure of this element changes upon binding to S-adenosyl methionine (SAM) to a conformation that blocks the shine-dalgarno sequence and blocks translation of the gene.

There are other known SAM-binding riboswitches such as SAM-I and SAM-II, but these appear to share no similarity in sequence or structure to SAM-III.

Structure
The crystal structure of the riboswitch from E. faecalis was solved by X-ray crystallography. The structure showed that the most conserved nucleotides involved in SAM binding were organised around a junction between three helices. In some species there are large insertions of up to 210 nucleotides within this structure.

See also
 SAH riboswitch
 SAM-I riboswitch
 SAM-II riboswitch
 SAM-IV riboswitch
 SAM-V riboswitch
 SAM-VI riboswitch
 SAM-Chlorobi RNA motif
 SAM–SAH riboswitch

References

External links
 

Cis-regulatory RNA elements
Riboswitch